is a former Japanese footballer who last played for Tokyo Verdy as a left back.

Playing career
After playing with several teams, most recently Tokyo Verdy (though only playing one game for the club), Higa announced his retirement at 30 years old in February 2019.

Career statistics

Club
Updated to 23 December 2018.

International

Awards and honours

Japan
Asian Games: 1
 2010

References

External links

 – at Ryutsu Keizai University FC Official site
Profile at JEF United Chiba
Profile at Tokyo Verdy

1989 births
Living people
Ryutsu Keizai University alumni
Association football people from Okinawa Prefecture
Japanese footballers
Japan youth international footballers
J1 League players
J2 League players
Yokohama F. Marinos players
Kyoto Sanga FC players
JEF United Chiba players
Tokyo Verdy players
Asian Games medalists in football
Footballers at the 2010 Asian Games
Medalists at the 2010 Asian Games
Asian Games gold medalists for Japan
Association football defenders
Universiade bronze medalists for Japan
Universiade medalists in football
Medalists at the 2009 Summer Universiade
Medalists at the 2011 Summer Universiade